The Marston Vale line (Network Rail route MD 140) is the line between  and  in England, a surviving remnant of the former Varsity line between  and , most of which was closed in the late 1960s. The line is sponsored by the Marston Vale community rail partnership. The line is to be adopted and upgraded as part of East West Rail, a project underway to re-establish the OxfordCambridge route.

History
The line was opened in 1846 by the London and Birmingham Railway, though the L&B merged with the Grand Junction Railway to become the London and North Western Railway whilst construction was ongoing – the LNWR ran it from its opening. Much of the line was built on land owned by the 7th Duke of Bedford, who supported the line but insisted that any station on his estate (Fenny Stratford, Woburn Sands, Ridgmont and Millbrook) be constructed in half-timbered style.

The line was threatened in the late 1950s and again in 1964 – though the Bletchley to Oxford and Bedford to Cambridge sections succumbed in December 1967, the Bletchley to Bedford section survived.

In 1977 the Parliamentary Select Committee on Nationalised Industries recommended that electrification of more of Britain's rail network be considered. By 1979 British Rail presented a range of options to do so by 2000, some of which included the Marston Vale line. The proposal was not implemented.

Silverlink operated the line from privatisation in 1996 until 2007. Services were initially in the hands of a mixture of heritage slam-door diesel multiple units formed of 2-car Class 117 and single-car Class 121 units until replacement with Class 150/1 trains inherited from Central Trains.

London Midland took over in 2007 until 9/12/2017. They used a mixture of Class 150/1 and Class 153 multiple units, inherited from Silverlink.

On 10 December 2017, West Midlands Trains took over the franchise, staff and rolling stock, operating as London Northwestern Railway.

Operation
The line is part of the Network Rail Strategic Route 18, SRS 18.12 and is classified as a rural line.

Passenger services are operated by West Midlands Trains, using two-car class 230 units.
An hourly service operates in each direction Monday–Saturday.

It is one of a number of British Railways that is covered by a Community Rail Partnership, in this case known as the Marston Vale Community Rail Partnership. Like other Community Rail Partnerships around the country, the Partnership aims to increase use of the line by getting local people involved with their local line. They do this by various means, such as holding community events, running special train services, and publicising the line locally.

From December 2018, West Midlands Trains were to introduce Class 230 D-Trains, built by Vivarail, onto the route, replacing the current trains, but the introduction was delayed until going into service on 23 April 2019. In November 2022, Vivarail, the manufacturers and maintainers of the Class 230, entered administration: consequently London Northwestern Railway introduced a rail replacement bus service from December and, is working on options to restore the rail service.

In February 2023, Rail magazine reported that WMT plans to replace the Class 230 fleet with Class 150 DMUs.  The 150s are not expected until 2024, which is when they are due to be released by Northern Trains.

Infrastructure
Apart from a short length of single track at both ends, the line is double track, and is not electrified.

Proposed developments

East West Rail

The Marston Vale line is one of the two remaining sections of the former Varsity line still in passenger use. The programme aims to reinstate the entire Oxford-Cambridge line, including changes to current Marston Vale line stations.

Extension to Milton Keynes Central
Work began on 4 December 2006 at the station to prepare for a service connection. The platform was ready for use in January 2009 but the service did not materialise and there are no longer any published plans for it to do so. A firm service pattern on East West Rail remains to be announced but the illustrative pattern has no BedfordMilton Keynes Central service; passengers will continue to have to change at Bletchley. There is no east-to-north chord between this line and the WCML: , the route the chord might take is occupied by trade outlets and a warehouse.

See also

 Marston Vale

Footnotes

References

Sources

External links
 Marston Vale Community Rail Partnership
 East West Rail Link consortium

Rail transport in Bedfordshire
Rail transport in Buckinghamshire
Community railway lines in England
Rail transport in Milton Keynes
Network Rail routes
Railway lines in the East of England
Railway lines in South East England
East West Rail